The Jacksonville Breeze were a team in the Legends Football League based in Jacksonville, Florida. They played their home games at Jacksonville Veterans Memorial Arena.

The team originated as the Tampa Breeze in 2009, the inaugural year for the Lingerie Football League. They played their home games at Tampa Bay Times Forum in downtown Tampa, Florida. After three seasons, they relocated to Jacksonville in September 2012. However, the league postponed the 2012–13 season to spring 2013 and rebranded to the Legends Football League. Most of the team's players were recruited from the pool of local athletes.

On January 27, 2015, the LFL stated that the Breeze had suspended operations with plans to relaunch in another Florida market within the next three years.

References

External links
Jacksonville Breeze official website

American football teams in Florida
American football teams in Jacksonville, Florida
Legends Football League US teams
Sports teams in Jacksonville, Florida
American football teams established in 2009
American football teams disestablished in 2015
2009 establishments in Florida
2015 disestablishments in Florida
Women's sports in Florida